Scotland Run Golf Club is a public golf course and country club located in Williamstown, New Jersey. Opened in 1999, the 18-hole course was built on an old sand quarry, providing a blend of wooded, quarry and links-style landscaping. Five holes come into contact with the quarry landscape. Most notably the 16th hole is where golfers must hit over the quarry and into the landing area, nearly 400 yards from the black tee.

Scotland Run was named one of the Top 50 Public Courses in the country by the readers of Golf World in their annual Readers' Choice Awards in 2009 and 2010. The course also has the honor of being awarded the #1 course in the Philadelphia Region by Business Week Magazine.

References

External links 

Scotland Run – GolfLink

1999 establishments in New Jersey
Buildings and structures in Gloucester County, New Jersey
Golf clubs and courses in New Jersey
Monroe Township, Gloucester County, New Jersey